= Joséphine Siongo Nkumu =

Congolese local politician

Madame Thomas Nkumu, née Joséphine Siongo was a Congolese local politician. She was the first Congolese woman to sit on Léopoldville's city council.

Nkumu became Léopoldville's first woman city councillor in 1956. In 1957 she was appointed the Congolese delegate to the World Union of Catholic Women’s Organizations. After visiting Belgium she reported on the remarkable way in which a Belgian husband and wife behaved as "one item":

They share the same goal, and they make decisions only after mutual concertation. After work, the husband comes back home immediately and with his wife he works in the garden, takes care of the children.

Though there was an implicit contrast here with traditional views of women's domestic responsibilities, Nkumu did not distance herself from these:

The role of a black woman is to aid her husband to promote the household economy. In this same order of ideas, I cannot tolerate my husband having any other washerwoman than myself. The order and cleanliness of the home and parcel of land devolves on me personally.
